James Johnson (born May 5, 1980) is an American former professional gridiron football player.

Johnson did not play high school football. He started playing for West Los Angeles Junior College, but was not given any equipment until he made the team as a defensive back, after being switched from running back. Arkansas State University then gave him a scholarship.

Johnson was signed as a free agent by the Saskatchewan Roughriders in 2006, and dressed for a total of 15 games, starting seven at cornerback. His college coach had sent a videotape to former Riders general manager Roy Shivers. "My college coach gave Mr. Shivers a call," said Johnson. "Mr. Shivers didn't really get a chance to see any tape on me, so he decided he was just going to bring me to camp. If I didn't perform he was going to send me home right away. I probably had the best training camp since my first year playing."

Johnson was named the Most Valuable Player of the 95th Grey Cup on Nov 25, 2007 after intercepting a record three passes, including one for a 30-yard touchdown. His defensive efforts helped lead the Saskatchewan Roughriders to a 23–19 victory over their CFL Prairie rival Winnipeg Blue Bombers. It was the first time since 1994 that a defensive player was awarded the Grey Cup's top individual title. Johnson received a $10,000 bonus in cash for his efforts.

"I could never imagine this. That's the first time I've ever had three interceptions in a game."

It was only the Roughriders' third national football championship in 15 Grey Cup appearances.

On February 16, 2009, Johnson was traded to the Winnipeg Blue Bombers in exchange for a draft pick in the 2011 Canadian College Draft.

Johnson became a free agent on February 15, 2010.

References

External links
 ESPN.com bio

1980 births
Living people
American football defensive backs
Canadian football defensive backs
Arkansas State Red Wolves football players
Saskatchewan Roughriders players
Players of American football from Los Angeles
Players of Canadian football from Los Angeles